Brian Campbell Shaw (November 8, 1930 – July 27, 1993) was a Canadian ice hockey coach. He was the head coach of the Edmonton Oilers of the World Hockey Association during the 1973–74 and 1974–75 WHA seasons.

Shaw grew up in Nordegg, Alberta. He played junior ice hockey with the Jasper Place Mohawks.

Shaw formerly coached the Moose Jaw Canucks, St. Catharines Black Hawks, and Edmonton Oil Kings junior teams. He took the Hawks from last place to first place in the Ontario Hockey Association during his first season. A fiery competitor, Shaw was suspended during the 1971–72 season because of an altercation with a fan.

Shaw died in 1993, aged 62, of lymphoma. At the time of his death he had been the owner of the Portland Winterhawks. Following the revelation of the Graham James sexual abuse scandal, Shaw was posthumously accused by several of his former junior players of having made unwanted sexual advances.

On March 6, 2010, Shaw was posthumously inducted into the inaugural class of the Portland Winterhawks' Hall of Fame. The honor was accepted by his nephew, former Winterhawks player Brian "Bunny" Shaw.

WHA coaching statistics

References

External links
Coach's profile at Hockeydb.com

1930 births
1993 deaths
Canadian ice hockey coaches
Edmonton Oil Kings (WCHL) coaches
Edmonton Oilers coaches
Moose Jaw Canucks coaches
People from Clearwater County, Alberta
World Hockey Association coaches